is a railway station on the Watarase Keikoku Line in the city of Nikkō, Tochigi, Japan, operated by the third-sector railway operator Watarase Keikoku Railway.

Lines

Station layout
The station has a single side platform.

Adjacent stations

History
Matō Station opened on 31 December 1914 as a station on the Ashio Railway.

Surrounding area
Ashio Akakura Post Office
Ashio Copper Mine

See also
 List of railway stations in Japan

External links

 Station information (Watarase Keikoku) 

Railway stations in Tochigi Prefecture
Railway stations in Japan opened in 1914
Nikkō, Tochigi